David Seidenkamp (born 15 January 1970) is an Australian former rugby league footballer who played as a  and occasionally on the  in the 1990s. His club career was with the Canterbury-Bankstown Bulldogs, Eastern Suburbs Roosters and the Western Suburbs Magpies.

Playing career
Seidenkamp was graded by the Canterbury-Bankstown Bulldogs in 1989. He made his first grade debut from the bench in his side's 12−6 loss against the North Sydney Bears at Belmore Sports Ground in round 14 of the 1990 season. Seidenkamp also played in the Bulldogs' 1991 President's Cup grand final victory over the Western Suburbs Magpies. Seidenkamp's stint with Canterbury ended at the conclusion of the 1991 season.

Seidenkamp joined the Eastern Suburbs Roosters in 1992, and in what was a season that produced mixed fortunes for the Roosters, Seidenkamp starred, playing in 17 of their 22 games, and scored 8 tries and finished the season as the team's equal top try scorer along with fellow Roosters 1992 newcomers Gary Freeman and Nigel Gaffey. Seidenkamp scored a hat-trick in his side's 56−16 thumping over the South Sydney Rabbitohs the final round of the 1992 season. Seidenkamp's stint with Roosters ended at the conclusion of the 1993 season.

In 1995, Seidenkamp joined the Western Suburbs Magpies. His lone first grade appearance for the Magpies came in his side's 32−16 defeat against the North Sydney Bears at North Sydney Oval in round 21. With injuries plaguing his career, Seidenkamp prematurely retired at the end of the 1995 season. He finished his career playing 33 games, and scoring 12 tries.

References

1970 births
Australian rugby league players
Canterbury-Bankstown Bulldogs players
Sydney Roosters players
Western Suburbs Magpies players
Rugby league fullbacks
Rugby league wingers
Living people
Rugby league players from Sydney
Sportsmen from New South Wales